Luftstreitkräfte is a German word which literally means air force.  In particular it may refer to:

Luftstreitkräfte, the Imperial German Army Air Service during World War I (only called the Luftstreitkräfte from 1916)
Luftstreitkräfte der NVA, the air force of the German Democratic Republic (1956 to 1990)
Austrian Air Force, known in German as the Österreichische Luftstreitkräfte

See also
Luftwaffe (disambiguation), similar term used for the German and Swiss air forces